The year 1663 in science and technology involved some significant events.

Astronomy
 James Gregory publishes Optica Promota, describing the Gregorian telescope.

Exploration
 March 4 – The Prince Edward Islands in the sub-antarctic Indian Ocean are discovered by Barent Barentszoon Lam of the Dutch ship Maerseveen and named Dina (Prince Edward) and Maerseveen (Marion).

Mathematics
 The first book about games of chance, Girolamo Cardano's Liber de ludo aleae ("On Casting the Die"), written in the 1560s, is published.

Meteorology
 October 7 – Robert Hooke presents his "Method for making a history of the weather" to the Royal Society.

Publications
 Robert Boyle publishes Considerations touching the Usefulness of Experimental Natural Philosophy (first part).

Births
 August 31 – Guillaume Amontons, French scientific instrument inventor and physicist (died 1705)

Deaths
 December 28 – Francesco Maria Grimaldi, Italian physicist (born 1618)

References

 
17th century in science
1660s in science